Ljudet av ditt hjärta is a 2009 studio album by Swedish band the Drifters.

The album consists of several Kikki Danielsson references, with cover versions of songs like "Nashville, Tennessee" and "Öppna vatten". Even "Islands in the Stream" (as "Öar i ett hav"), "You Don't Have to Say You Love Me" ("Io che non vivo senza te") and "Walk on By" had been recorded by Kikki Danielsson earlier.

Track listing

Drifters 
Mattias – drums
Ronny – guitar
Erica – vocals and saxophone
Stellan – keyboards
Kent – bass

Production, arrangement and mixed by: Kent Liljefjäll and Martin Klaman
A & R: Pär Winberg
Mastering: Uffe Börjesson, Earhear
Design: Johan Lindberg
Photo: Thomas Harrysson
Cosmetics: Kia Wennberg
Hair: Micke Gardell
Coordination: Fredrik Järnberg

Charts

References 

2009 albums
Drifters (Swedish band) albums
Swedish-language albums